George Herbert Stabb (26 September 1912 – 11 December 1994) was an English footballer who played for Torquay United, Notts County, Port Vale, and Bradford Park Avenue in the 1930s.

Career
Stabb played for Dartmouth United and Paignton Town, before joining Torquay United in September 1931. He scored three goals in 12 Third Division South games in 1931–32. He claimed his first goal in the Football League on 7 September in a 10–2 defeat to Fulham at Craven Cottage. He went on to score 26 goals in 45 appearances in the 1932–33 season to finish as the club's top-scorer. He scored a hat-trick in an 8–1 win over Southend United at Plainmoor on 10 September, and bagged another hat-trick in a 3–2 victory over Watford on 18 March. He then went on to score 15 goals in 1933–34 as he finished as the "Gulls" top-scorer for a second successive season. He then moved on to Notts County. He spent the 1933–34 season at Meadow Lane, and scored five goals in 24 Second Division games.

He signed with Port Vale in July 1935. He enjoyed a great start to his career with the "Valiants", scoring one goal in each of the first four Second Division games of the 1935–36 season. However, he damaged a cartilage during a 5–1 defeat to Burnley at Turf Moor on 9 September. This injury required surgery, though he regained his place in the team after recovering in November. In the FA Cup, he scored against First Division champions Sunderland at Roker Park and The Old Recreation Ground, as Vale drew 2–2 before recording a shock 2–0 victory. However Vale slipped to relegation into the Third Division North. Stabb played twice at the start of the 1936–37 season, before transferring to Bradford Park Avenue, back in the Second Division, in September 1936.

Career statistics
Source:

References

1912 births
1994 deaths
People from Paignton
English footballers
Association football wing halves
Association football forwards
Dartmouth A.F.C. players
Torquay United F.C. players
Notts County F.C. players
Port Vale F.C. players
Bradford (Park Avenue) A.F.C. players
Huddersfield Town A.F.C. wartime guest players
English Football League players